Sir Thomas Gerard, 1st Baronet (1560 – 16 February 1621) was an English politician who sat in the House of Commons at various times between 1597 and 1621.

Gerard was the son of Sir Thomas Gerard, of Bryn Hall and his wife Elizabeth Port, daughter of Sir John Port, of Etwall, Derbyshire. His brother Fr. John Gerard, was later ordained a Roman Catholic priest of the Society of Jesus and operated an underground ministry in Elizabethan England. Thomas Gerard matriculated at Brasenose College, Oxford  on 20 July 1578, aged 18. In 1579 he was a student of the Inner Temple. His parents and brother John were Catholics and he was tutored by a Catholic. His first wife Cecily was "a recusant and indicted thereof" and he employed a "notorious recusant" to educate his child and was described as "of evil affection in religion" in 1590.

Gerard was involved in an unfortunate incident in July 1583. He and wife were looking after a young Lancashire heiress Suzanne Abraham. A fencing master who was a relation of the girl invited them to a house in London near Cecil House. While the rest of the women were playing cards, the wife of the fencing master took Suzanne Abraham upstairs where she was secretly married to a stranger to gain her fortune. Recorder Fleetwood was appalled at the case.

Nevertheless, in 1597, he was elected Member of Parliament for Liverpool.  He succeeded his father to the family estates in September 1601. He was knighted on 18 April 1603. When the order of baronet was first instituted on 22 May 1611, he was created a baronet and the £1,000, that was due to the Crown for such creation, was returned in consideration of his Father's sufferings in the cause of the King's mother  Mary, Queen of Scots. In 1614 he was elected MP for Lancashire. He was elected MP for  Wigan  in 1621.

Gerard died at the age of about 60 and was buried at St Margaret's, Westminster, on 16 February 1621.

Gerard married  firstly Cecily Maney, daughter of Sir Walter Maney, of Staplehurst in about 1580, with whom he had a son and heir Thomas. He married secondly, after 1606, Mary Lee, widow of Sir Robert Lee, Lord Mayor of London, and formerly of William Smith, of London and daughter of Sir James Hawes who was also Lord Mayor. His third wife was Mary Uvedale, widow of Sir Edward Uvedale and formerly of the Hon. Anthony Browne and daughter of Sir William Dormer, of Wing, Buckinghamshire. He had no children by his second and third wives.

References

1560 births
1621 deaths
Alumni of Brasenose College, Oxford
Members of the Parliament of England (pre-1707) for Lancashire
Members of the Inner Temple
Members of the Parliament of England (pre-1707) for Liverpool
People from Wigan
Baronets in the Baronetage of England
Burials at St Margaret's, Westminster
English MPs 1597–1598
English MPs 1614
English MPs 1621–1622